Marrakesh Express is an album by saxophonist Stan Getz and orchestra arranged and conducted by Richard Hewson which was released on the MGM label in 1970.

Reception

The Allmusic site awarded the album 3 stars.

Track listing
 "Marrakesh Express" (Graham Nash) - 3:24
 "Raindrops Keep Fallin' on My Head" (Burt Bacharach, Hal David) - 3:35
 "I'll Never Fall in Love Again" (Bacharach, David) - 2:50
 "Both Sides, Now" (Joni Mitchell) - 3:18
 "Without Her" (Harry Nilsson) - 3:16
 "Cecilia" (Paul Simon) - 4:05
 "Love Theme from Romeo and Juliet" (Nino Rota) - 4:24
"Medley: Because/Do You Know The Way to San Jose" (John Lennon, Paul McCartney/Bacharach, David) - 8:03
 "Just a Child" (Johnny Mandel) - 4:39
 "The April Fools" (Bacharach, David) - 3:06

Personnel 
Stan Getz - tenor saxophone
Unidentified orchestra arranged and conducted by Richard Hewson
Jeff Jarratt - recording engineer

References 

1970 albums
Stan Getz albums
MGM Records albums
Albums produced by George Martin